The Saxby River is a river located in North West Queensland, Australia.

See also

References

Rivers of Queensland
North West Queensland